This is a list of notable bartenders. A bartender (also known as a barkeep or a mixologist) is a person who serves alcoholic beverages and other drinks behind a bar, typically in a licensed establishment.

Bartenders

B
 Jeff Berry
 Dick Bradsell
 Mocky Brereton
 Ruth Ellen Brosseau
 Aaron Buerge
 Ty Burrell

C
 Rob Cesternino
 Cheryl Charming
 Ada Coleman
 Tony Conigliaro
 Harry Craddock

D

 Dale DeGroff

E
 Jonathan Evison

F
 Colin Peter Field

G
 Joe Gilmore

H
 Henry Hargreaves
 Sarah Ann Henley
 Jim Hewes

I

 Mark Ibold
 Atilla Iskifoglu

J
 Harry Johnson

K
Juyoung Kang

M
 Kelly Macdonald
 Lynnette Marrero
 Jared Martin
 Matt McQuillan
 Christopher Meloni
 Jeffrey Morgenthaler
 Victor Vaughn Morris

O

P
 Fernand Petiot

R
 Bill Ray
 Gary Regan

S
 Nicolas Saint-Jean
 Audrey Saunders
 Samuel Gilbert Scott
 Ronald Shiner
 Max Elliott Slade
 Maelcum Soul
 Tristan Stephenson
 Moe Szyslak

T

 Tatsuya Tanimoto
 Jerry Thomas
 Hubert Turtill

V
 Brian Van Flandern

W
 Jack Wall
 Brent Weeks
 David Whish-Wilson
 Michael Wolfe
 Brad Womack
 Hoy Wong
 Takumi Watanabe

See also
 Bar (establishment)
 List of public house topics

References

 list
bartender